During 1955 and 1956, a condensed radio dramatisation of The Lord of the Rings was broadcast in twelve episodes on BBC Radio's the Third Programme. These radio broadcasts were the first dramatisation of The Lord of the Rings, a book by J. R. R. Tolkien, the final volume of which, The Return of the King, had been published in October 1955. Since the BBC did not generally keep long-term archives of its productions at that time, no copies of the full adaptation are known to have survived. A single clip from a 2016 radio special by BBC Sounds can be heard around the four-minute mark of the recording playing the opening theme of the series. Although virtually all audio of the series is lost, in 2022 Stuart Lee discovered the full script for the dramatization in the BBC archives, including annotations by Tolkien himself. Lee's research on the script was published as an essay in The Great Tales Never End: Essays in Memory of Christopher Tolkien (2022).

The first part of the story, The Fellowship of the Ring, was broadcast in six episodes in 1955. The final two volumes, The Two Towers and The Return of the King were covered in six episodes broadcast in 1956. Both series of broadcasts were adapted and produced by Terence Tiller, who corresponded with Tolkien for advice concerning the second series. This was the only one of several adaptations of The Lord of the Rings that Tolkien lived to see, as he died in 1973.

Radio was the dominant broadcast medium in the United Kingdom at the time, and the broadcasts helped to publicise the books. The broadcasts were discussed on the BBC programme The Critics, and discussion of the broadcasts brought them to the attention of a Mr Sam Gamgee, who subsequently wrote to Tolkien to ask about the origin of the name of the character Sam Gamgee.

The cast included Norman Shelley as Gandalf and Tom Bombadil, Felix Felton as Bilbo and Sauron and Robert Farquharson as Saruman and Denethor.

Quotes from J. R. R. Tolkien
The author's opinion on these broadcasts was revealed in several letters he wrote, which were posthumously published in 1981 in The Letters of J. R. R. Tolkien.

"I think the book quite unsuitable for 'dramatization', and have not enjoyed the broadcasts—though they have improved. I thought Tom Bombadil dreadful—but worse still was the announcer's preliminary remarks that Goldberry was his daughter (!), and that Willowman was an ally of Mordor (!!)." (The Letters of J. R. R. Tolkien, Letter 175, 30 November 1955)

"I think poorly of the broadcast adaptations. Except for a few details I think they are not well done, even granted the script and the legitimacy of the enterprise (which I do not grant). But they took some trouble with the names. I thought that the dwarf (Glóin not Gimli [...]) was not too bad, if a bit exaggerated." (The Letters of J. R. R. Tolkien, Letter 176, 8 December 1955)

[To Terence Tiller, concerning accents]: "I paid great attention to such linguistic differentiation as was possible: in diction, idiom and so on; and I doubt if much more can be imported, except in so far as the individual actor represents his feeling for the character in tone and style." (The Letters of J. R. R. Tolkien, Letter 193, 2 November 1956)

[To Terence Tiller, concerning scripts for three of the episodes]: "Here is a book very unsuitable for dramatic or semi-dramatic representation. If that is attempted, it needs more space, a lot of space. [...] Personally, I think it requires rather the older art of the reading 'mime', than the more nearly dramatic, which results in too great an emphasis on dialogue (mostly with its setting removed). [...] I feel you have had a very hard task." (The Letters of J. R. R. Tolkien, Letter 194, 6 November 1956)

[Replying to his publisher concerning an enquiry about the possibility of making a cartoon of The Lord of the Rings]: "I think I should find vulgarization less painful than the sillification achieved by the B.B.C." (The Letters of J. R. R. Tolkien, Letter 198, 19 June 1957)

Cast

Derek Hart – Narrator
Oliver Burt – Frodo
Norman Shelley – Gandalf, Tom Bombadil, Old Man, Additional voices
Victor Platt – Sam
Godfrey Kenton – Aragorn, Mablung, Additional voices
Michael Collins – Merry
Basil Jones – Pippin
Felix Felton – Bilbo, Sauron, The Black Captain, Orcs, Additional voices
Derek Prentice – Boromir, Faramir, Beregond, Orcs, Additional voices
Frank Duncan – Legolas, Halbarad, Additional voices
Eric Lugg – Gimli, Additional voices
Gerik Schjelderup – Gollum, Orcs
Robert Farquharson – Saruman, Denethor
Valentine Dyall – Théoden, Treebeard, Orcs
Bernard Rebel – Wormtongue
Garard Green – Elrond, Celeborn, Additional voices
Nicolette Bernard – Galadriel, Goldberry
John Baker – Orcs
Olive Gregg – Eowyn
David Hemmings – Bergil
Noel Johnson – Éomer
Prunella Scales – Ioreth
Roger Snowdon – Orcs

References

Radio programmes based on Middle-earth
Lord of the Rings (1955 radio series)
Lord of the Rings (1955 radio series)
Lord of the Rings (1955 radio series)
Lord of the Rings (1955 radio series)
Fantasy radio programs
Lost radio programs
Works based on The Lord of the Rings